George A. Mayer (1917-2000) was a member of the Wisconsin State Senate.

Biography
Mayer was born on January 10, 1917, in Milwaukee County, Wisconsin. During World War II, he served in the United States Army. He graduated from Yale University and Harvard Law School. He was a lawyer and stock broker. He served on the Chenequa, Wisconsin, village board and died in Chenequa on December 15, 2000.

Political career
Mayer was a member of the Senate from 1949 to 1952. He was a Republican.

References

External links
The Political Graveyard

People from Milwaukee County, Wisconsin
Yale University alumni
Harvard Law School alumni
Wisconsin city council members
Wisconsin lawyers
Republican Party Wisconsin state senators
Military personnel from Wisconsin
United States Army soldiers
United States Army personnel of World War II
1917 births
2000 deaths
20th-century American lawyers
20th-century American politicians
People from Chenequa, Wisconsin